Untitled is the second full-length album by American hardcore punk band The Armed. It was released June 23, 2015 for free via Bandcamp. The album cover is a play on the cover of Aladdin Sane by David Bowie. It features drummer Nick Yasyshyn (Sumac, Baptists) and was recorded and produced by Kurt Ballou at GodCity studio.

Reception

Track listing

References

2015 albums
The Armed albums
Albums produced by Kurt Ballou